AIK Handboll is the handball section in AIK. The handball section of AIK was founded in 1943. They won the Swedish Championship in 1951 and reached the final again in 1952.

Kits

Sports Hall information

Name: – Solnahallen
City: – Solna
Capacity: – 2000
Address: – Ankdammsgatan 46, 171 67 Solna, Sweden

Accomplishments
 Swedish championship:
 : 1951

External links

 
 

Swedish handball clubs
AIK
1943 establishments in Sweden